Anthea Bell  (10 May 1936 – 18 October 2018) was an English translator of literary works, including children's literature, from French, German and Danish. These include The Castle by Franz Kafka, Austerlitz by W. G. Sebald, the Inkworld trilogy by Cornelia Funke and the French Asterix comics with co-translator Derek Hockridge.

Biography

Bell was born in Suffolk on 10 May 1936. According to her own accounts, she picked up lateral thinking abilities essential in a translator from her father Adrian Bell, Suffolk author and the first Times cryptic crossword setter. Her mother, Marjorie Bell (née Gibson), was a home maker. The couple's son, Bell's brother, Martin, is a former BBC correspondent who was an independent Member of Parliament for one parliamentary term.

After attending a boarding school in Bournemouth, she read English at Somerville College, Oxford. She was married to the publisher and writer Antony Kamm from 1957 to 1973; the couple had two sons, Richard and Oliver. Oliver Kamm is a leader writer for The Times. After her sons left home, she lived and worked in Cambridge. She died on 18 October 2018, aged 82.

Works
Anthea Bell's career as a translator began at the end of the 1950s when the German publisher Klaus Flugge asked Antony Kamm if he knew anyone able to translate Der kleine Wassermann, a book for children by Otfried Preussler. Kamm recommended his wife; Bell's English version entitled The Little Water Sprite was published in 1960. Eventually, she translated Preussler's entire works.

Over the decades, Bell translated numerous Franco-Belgian comics of the bande dessinée genre into English, including Asterix – for which her new puns were praised for keeping the original French spirit intact. Peter Hunt, now Professor Emeritus in Children's Literature at Cardiff University, has written of her "ingenious translations" of the French originals which "in a way display the art of the translator at its best". Other comic books she has translated include Le Petit Nicolas, Lieutenant Blueberry, and Iznogoud.

She specialised in translating children's literature, and re-translated Hans Christian Andersen's fairytales from Danish for the publishing house of G.P. Putnam's Sons. She also translated the Inkworld trilogy by Cornelia Funke and the Ruby Red Trilogy by Kerstin Gier. Other work includes The Princess and the Captain (2006), translated from La Princetta et le Capitaine by Anne-Laure Bondoux.
  
Bell also translated into English many adult novels, as well as some books on art history, and musicology. She has translated W.G. Sebald's Austerlitz (plus other works by Sebald), and Władysław Szpilman's memoir The Pianist (translated, at the author's request, from the German version). Her translations of works by Stefan Zweig have been said to have helped restore his reputation among anglophone readers, and that of E.T.A. Hoffmann's The Life and Opinions of the Tomcat Murr (originally Lebensansichten des Katers Murr) has had a positive effect on Hoffman's profile as well. In addition, Penguin Classics published Bell's new translation of Sigmund Freud's The Psychopathology of Everyday Life in 2003. Oxford University Press published her translation of Kafka's The Castle in 2009.

She contributed an essay titled "Translation: Walking the Tightrope of Illusion" to a 2006 book, The Translator as Writer, in which she explained her preference for 'invisible' translation whereby she creates the illusion that readers are not reading a translation "but the real thing".

Bell was appointed Officer of the Order of the British Empire (OBE) in the 2010 New Year Honours for services to literature and literary translations. Bell received the German Federal Republic's Cross of Merit in 2015.

Illness and death
In a December 2017 newspaper column, Bell's son Oliver Kamm revealed his mother had entered a nursing home due to illness a year earlier, and "her great mind has now departed". As a result of her forced retirement, the 37th book in the Asterix series, Asterix and the Chariot Race (published in October 2017), was translated by Adriana Hunter. The end of the book has a message of thanks from the publishers to Bell for "her wonderful translation work on Asterix over the years".

Bell died on 18 October 2018 at the age of 82.

Notable awards
 1987 – Schlegel-Tieck Prize for Hans Bemmann's The Stone and the Flute
 1996 – Marsh Award for Children's Literature in Translation – for Christine Nöstlinger's A Dog's Life translated from German
 2002 – Helen and Kurt Wolff Translator's Prize, Goethe Institute – for W. G. Sebald's Austerlitz
 2002 –  Independent Foreign Fiction Prize – for W. G. Sebald's Austerlitz
 2002 – Schlegel-Tieck Prize for W. G. Sebald's Austerlitz
 2003 – Schlegel-Tieck Prize – for Karen Duve's Rain translated from German
 2003 – Marsh Award for Children's Literature in Translation – for Hans Magnus Enzensberger's Where Were You Robert? translated from German
 2007 – Marsh Award for Children's Literature in Translation – for Kai Meyer's The Flowing Queen translated from German
 2009 – Oxford-Weidenfeld Translation Prize – for Saša Stanišić's How the Soldier Repairs the Gramophone
 2009 – Schlegel-Tieck Prize for Stefan Zweig's Burning Secret
 2017 – Eric Carle Museum Bridge Award for contributions to children's literature

Mildred L. Batchelder Award

The Mildred L. Batchelder Award is unusual in that it is given to a publisher yet it explicitly references a given work, its translator and its author. Its intent is to encourage the translation of children's works into English in order "to eliminate barriers to understanding between people of different cultures, races, nations, and languages."

Anthea Bell, translating from German, French and Danish, has been mentioned for more works than any other individual or organisation (including publishers) in the history of the award:

References

Further reading
 
 
 Opening Speech, Anthea Bell, Shelving Translation Conference, April 2004
 Making Asterix funny in English, The Connexion, March 2010
 Anthea Bell interview with Writer Unboxed
  Reviews of Anthea Bell's Stefan Zweig translations at Bookslut
"W.G. Sebald: A Translator's View," by Anthea Bell at Five Dials
Anthea Bell, Translator of Freud, Kafka and Comics, Dies at 82

External links
 

1936 births
2018 deaths
Writers from Suffolk
Alumni of Somerville College, Oxford
British translators
Danish–English translators
Fellows of the Royal Society of Literature
French–English translators
German–English translators
Literary translators
Officers of the Order of the British Empire
Recipients of the Order of Merit of the Federal Republic of Germany
Translators of Sigmund Freud
Winners of the Marsh Award for Children's Literature in Translation